The Sidewinder is a 1964 album by the jazz trumpeter Lee Morgan, recorded at the Van Gelder Studio in Englewood Cliffs, New Jersey, U.S. It was released on the Blue Note label as BLP 4157 (mono) and BST 84157 (stereo).

The title track is perhaps Morgan's all-around best-known composition; it would go on to become a jazz standard, and was additionally released as a single, reaching number 81 on the Billboard Hot 100 in January 1965.

The album became Blue Note's best-selling record ever, breaking the previous sales record and saving the label from near bankruptcy. Record producer Michael Cuscuna recalls the unexpected success: "the company issued only 4,000 copies upon release. Needless to say, they ran out of stock in three or four days. And 'The Sidewinder' became a runaway smash making the pop 100 charts." By January 1965, the album had reached No. 25 on the Billboard chart. The title track was used as the music in a Chrysler television advertisement and as a theme for television shows. At the insistence of Blue Note executives, several of Morgan's intended follow-up albums either had their release postponed or were shelved entirely so that Blue Note "could score another Sidewinder". Morgan's subsequent albums would therefore attempt to approximate the format and appeal of The Sidewinder by opening with a soul-jazz boogaloo inspired composition while also attempting to capture a hard bop aesthetic. This approach is said to be most noticeable on Morgan's immediate follow-up albums, including The Rumproller, The Gigolo and Cornbread.

Reception
The Penguin Guide to Jazz selected this album as part of its suggested "Core Collection" (with a crown), calling the title track "a glorious 24-bar theme as sinuous and stinging as the beast of the title. It was both the best and worst thing that was ever to happen to Morgan before the awful events of 19 February 1972," referring to Morgan's killing at the hand of his common-law wife, Helen Moore.
The album was identified by Scott Yanow in his AllMusic essay "Hard Bop" as one of the 17 Essential Hard Bop Recordings.

Track listing
All songs composed by Lee Morgan.
 "The Sidewinder" – 10:25
 "Totem Pole" – 10:11
 "Gary's Notebook" – 6:03
 "Boy, What a Night" – 7:30
 "Hocus Pocus" – 6:21
 "Totem Pole" [Alternative take] – 9:57 Bonus track on CD reissue

Personnel
 Lee Morgan – trumpet
 Joe Henderson – tenor saxophone
 Barry Harris – piano
 Bob Cranshaw – double bass
 Billy Higgins – drums

References

External links
 Helgeson, Jeff.  Lee Morgan: Biography. Accessed August 13, 2007
 Leonard Feather on The Sidewinder
 NPR: Basic Jazz Record Library

1964 albums
Albums produced by Alfred Lion
Blue Note Records albums
Lee Morgan albums
Albums recorded at Van Gelder Studio